Malkowice or Małkowice may refer to:

Malkowice, Lesser Poland Voivodeship (south Poland)
Malkowice, Świętokrzyskie Voivodeship (south-central Poland)
Małkowice, Lower Silesian Voivodeship (south-west Poland)
Małkowice, Opole Voivodeship (south-west Poland)
Małkowice, Subcarpathian Voivodeship (south-east Poland)

See also
Malkowitz (disambiguation)